is a Japanese light novel series written by Tetsuto Uesu and illustrated by Tamago no Kimi. A 12-episode anime adaptation by Arms aired between July and September 2012. It has been licensed in North America by Funimation with the Blu-ray version releasing on December 17, 2013.

Plot
The story follows a world where several young men and women regularly find themselves spirited away to a world of sword and magic called . Those who survive and return are typically gifted with magic abilities. An international training organization named Babel protects these young returnees and trains them in the use of their power. A wayward hero named Akatsuki has come back to his world, along with a beautiful girl called Miu who is the daughter of the Last Dark Lord, whom he defeated in battle.

Characters

Class B

Akatsuki is the male protagonist and the titular "Rogue Hero". Akatsuki is a tall young man, with messy purple hair and blue eyes. He is usually seen wearing either the standard Babel uniform or gym clothes; while in Alayzard he wears sleeveless medieval-style leather armour. Akatsuki returns to Earth after killing the Dark Lord and becoming a hero in Alayzard. The dying Dark Lord entrusted his daughter, Miu, to Akatsuki and to keep her safe, he brings Miu back to Earth. Like other returnees, Akatsuki attends Babel school along with Miu (who poses as his long lost sister - although while talking in his sleep, he reveals that his sister is dead.) Akatsuki is usually very laid back and displays an almost arrogant (although justified) confidence in his abilities. Although usually presenting a rough and perverted personality, deep down he is really a noble character. Though he does not seem to pay attention much in class, he performs very well academically. Akatsuki, unlike most Babel students, cannot use magic, since he did not learn or pick up any magic in Alayzard. However, he is a master of Renkankei-kikō, which is the ability to control the Chi (energy flow) of oneself, others and the surroundings. He was taught how to tap into this power while in Alayzard and in the anime he states that he chose to learn this power in preference to learning magic. The full nature of this power has not been revealed.

Arms Device (or "AD" for short) are wristbands that are given to students during training. When an AD is worn, it conforms to the user's natural powers and abilities and transforms into the weapon most suitable for the user. Akatsuki could not initially generate an AD because he had only been given one of them and it was not strong enough to manifest his power. Upon noticing that something happened when he put on an AD borrowed from a fellow student in addition to his own (believing that his own may be broken), Akatsuki kept putting on more AD (seven) until his AD weapon finally manifested in the form a huge, unusual sword with tremendous power. The seven AD are the minimum number needed to manifest the sword - if he wears more AD wristbands the sword changes shape and becomes even more powerful. This other-dimensional sword, which is called "Laevateinn", has writings engraved upon it. Since discovering this new ability, Akastuki regularly employs it in battle. He also managed to control "Sleipnir", a magical supersonic motorcycle once driven by his father.

Miu is the main heroine, and the Dark Lord's daughter, whom Akatsuki brought back to the real world to fulfill her father's last wish that he take care of her. Miu is portrayed as a sweet and innocent 16 year old girl with green eyes and pink hair that is usually kept in twin tails. She is a busty young girl of average height; a running gag being her difficulties in finding clothes large enough to fit her chest. She poses as Akatsuki's long lost little sister to conceal her identity and relies on him for guidance. Miu is initially conflicted about Akatsuki. She knows that she should resent him for killing her father, but she is also grateful to him for saving her from her enemies in Alayzard and looking after her in the real world. She gradually comes to accept that Akatsuki had his role to play (as the Rogue Hero) just as her father was the Hero's enemy and she falls in love with him. Miu has a high level of magical skills, being able to generate Shield Magic without any effort and also use multiple magic spells - from different elements, no less - at one time, and in rapid succession. She seems to favor using Air-type Magic, as most of her magical circles appear green in color. Miu's AD weapon takes the form of a staff with an elaborate head, called Holy Tin. So far she has only been shown using it as a blocking weapon. It is assumed this staff can enhance Miu's magic as well.

Kuzuha is a young girl with turquoise hair and blue eyes. She is considerably shorter than the other students due to her age; she was originally enrolled in the grade school branch of Babel before being moved to the high school branch due to her remarkable intelligence. She is the class rep for Class B and takes her job very seriously despite her age. While not liking Akatsuki at first, she grows closer to him, even developing a small crush, after he helps her regain her spirit after an encounter with the Student Council. Akatsuki often teases her about her lack of stature, although not maliciously. She is a close friend of Miu, along with most of the other girls in the story. Her element is Earth and her AD weapon is a giant hammer.

Chikage is Akatsuki and Miu's classmate. She is a friendly, tomboyish girl with short brown hair and amber eyes. She becomes friends with Miu immediately. She is also a lesbian, and shamelessly admits it, though she develops a slight "liking" for Akatsuki. Her element is Water and her AD weapon is a longbow.

Kenya is a problematic student who was demoted to Class B from Class A. He does not get along with other students and tends to bully them. Akatsuki sets him in his place the first day of school, leading to him resenting Akatsuki, but during the Babel Ranking Tournament incident he bravely confronts Phil by himself. His element is Fire and his AD weapon is 2 pair of chakrams.

Class A

Kaidō is the laid-back, troublemaker student who declares himself to be the "leftover" of Class A. Despite talking to Akatsuki only a few times, Kaidō declares himself Akatsuki's best friend and calls him "Akki". He is implied to have ulterior motives (something to do with the organization known as Scarlet Twilight) and be very powerful, but so far has refrained from confronting Akatsuki, who he believes has yet to reveal his true strength.

Student Council

Kyoya is the Student Council's President. He has silver hair and blue eyes. A member of the COCOON, he usually has a manipulative smile on his face and cold look in his eyes. He is calm and collected towards Akatsuki's taunts to fight, however he has an interest in Akatsuki. He is also implied to have power equal to that of Akatsuki. His element is Ice and his AD weapon has not yet been seen.

Haruka is the Vice President of Student Council who has long, green hair and green eyes. She takes an initial dislike to Akatsuki for his non-compliant behavior in school. This dislike escalates to a deep resentment after he humiliates her by stealing both her panties and bra while being disciplined by the student council. She often refers to Akatsuki a "wolf" and other predatory names, but she seems to develop a crush on him later on after seeing glimpses of the noble character hidden by his rough and tough exterior (during the hostage taking, for example). Her element is Wind and her AD weapons are two push knives (similar to Eskimo Ulu).

Ryohei is the Secretary of the Student Council and has brown, short hair. His element is Fire and his AD weapon is a Dao (Chinese Broadsword). Although in Season 1, episode 8 it briefly shows him standing on the cliff holding a Dao in his right hand while another hilt is shown protruding from his left waist so it may be that he actually uses a pair of Dao.

Minami is the Treasurer of the Student Council, who has long brown hair and brown eyes. A quiet girl, she says things only when she needs to. Her element is Earth and her AD weapon is a single headed chain weapon known as a Liuxing Chui (Meteor Hammer).

Alayzard

Listy is the Princess of Sylphid, a country in Alayzard, whose brother died protecting Akatsuki. After the Dark Lord's demise, she attempts to prevent Akatsuki from returning home, unaware of his oath to protect Miu. She also seems to have some kind of affection towards Akatsuki. (She also does the previews for the next episodes in the anime adaptation.)

Leon was a hero of Alayzard who was engaged to Listy. He was killed by Galious while fighting him alongside Akatsuki and a splendid tomb was constructed for him. Unfortunately, the tomb was destroyed by Phil out of resentment over his own status and that the people were honoring someone who had failed.

Others

A holy knight of the Disdian army. He is ordered to capture Miu and return her to Alayzard for execution. He is also ordered to kill Akatsuki if he interferes. Phil made a contract with Zahhaku, a devious dragon from Alayzard, and uses it to attack anyone who stands in his way, especially Akatsuki. His weapon is capable of inflicting poison, which typically results in instant death. Phil destroyed Leon's tomb out of resentment and for glory, referring Leon as an eyesore to him.

Media

Light novels

The light novel series written by Tetsuto Uesu and illustrated by Tamago no Kimi was published by Hobby Japan in eleven volumes from May 1, 2010 to February 28, 2013.

Manga
A manga illustrated by Haiji Nakasone was published in Hobby Japan's web magazine Comic Dangan from January 20, 2012 to June 21, 2013 and compiled into three volumes.

|}

Anime
A 12-episode anime adaptation by Arms and directed by Rion Kujō began aired between July and September 2012. It has been licensed by Funimation in North America. Following Sony's acquisition of Crunchyroll, the series was moved to Crunchyroll. The opening theme is "Realization" by Faylan and the ending theme is "Ai no Sei de Nemurenai" by Aki Misato. Seven special short episodes titled "Hajirai Ippai" (numbered 0 to 6) were also included with the Blu-ray releases.

Episode list

See also
The Testament of Sister New Devil, another series by the same author

References

External links
Anime official website 
Light novel official website 

2010 Japanese novels
2012 anime television series debuts
Action anime and manga
Anime and manga based on light novels
Arms Corporation
AT-X (TV network) original programming
Fantasy anime and manga
Crunchyroll anime
Harem anime and manga
HJ Bunko
Hobby Japan manga
Isekai anime and manga
Isekai novels and light novels
Japanese webcomics
Light novels
Madman Entertainment anime
Shōnen manga
Tokyo MX original programming
Webcomics in print